Shawne P. Kleckner (born May 22, 1972, in Webster City, Iowa) is an American entrepreneur, co-founder and former president of Right Stuf, Inc., a company that distributes anime, manga, and figures/merchandise throughout the world.

Biography
Kleckner attended Southeast Polk High School and graduated from Iowa State University with a degree in Computer Engineering with a minor in History.

In the late 1980s, Kleckner worked for Century Systems, a Des Moines, Iowa-based computer reseller.  Robert Ferson, owner of Century Systems, was a fan of the 1960s television show Astro Boy. Originally a shell company created to buy and resell telescopes, Right Stuff (the original company name) was reborn as an animation sales company. While Ferson is no longer with the company, Astro Boy remains one of Right Stuf's top sellers.

Kleckner is a recipient of the ACE North American Entrepreneur of the Year award, and he has also been featured in Inc. and USA Today articles on entrepreneurship.  The Right Stuf International made the Inc. 500 list in 1999.  He was also selected as one of Des Moines' 40 Under 40 by the Des Moines Business Record.

Concurrent with his efforts at Right Stuf, Kleckner previously served as Vice President of Business Affairs and CFO of Century Systems (a systems integrator of computer hardware and software) and Senior Vice President of Intersphere Lasergames (a manufacturer of Lasertag equipment), and has served on several corporate boards.

Current board memberships include: Trinlogix, LLC, a software company specializing in three dimensional modeling of financial and other data for analysis, and the Des Moines Zen Center, a Soto Zen Buddhist organization.  Kleckner also serves as an advisor for Anime News Network.

Kleckner is passionate about the environment, and when his company moved to a new facility in 2005, he remodeled the facility to be LEED Certified, utilizing geothermal heating and cooling.  He supports events and organizations including Orchard Place mental health shelter, Trees Forever, Paws and Effect, Animal Rescue League of Iowa, Reggie's Sleepout, The Rooftop Foundation, Central Iowa's Boys & Girls Club, Holding Tiny Hands Foundation, Amanda the Panda, and the Iowa Coalition Against Domestic Violence. His business also sponsors a program that provides work experience to children with special needs from the Dallas Center-Grimes Community School District.

Right Stuf was acquired by Crunchyroll in August, 2022; On December 14, 2022, Kleckner retired from his position at Right Stuf

References

External links 
 Article on history of Right Stuf International Part 1
 Article on history of Right Stuf International Part 2
 
 

1972 births
21st-century American businesspeople
Living people
Businesspeople from Des Moines, Iowa
Anime industry
Manga industry
People from Webster City, Iowa